Living Bird is a quarterly magazine published by the Cornell Lab of Ornithology. Editorial director Gustave Axelson leads the team of writers, editors, and designers that produce the magazine.

Printed editions of Living Bird are distributed to members of the Cornell Lab of Ornithology. The photographs and artwork on the front and back covers as well as accompanying articles have been described as "stunning" and "beautiful". The magazine includes editorials and in-depth journalism on birds and bird conservation. From 2008 onward, issues of the magazine are also available online.

From 1962 through 1981, the magazine was published annually (with volume 19 being a multi-year edition covering 1980 and 1981). Since 1982, Living Bird has been published quarterly.

The magazine contains articles on birds, birding, science, conservation, people, art, photography, travel, and reviews of birding gear and books.

See also 
 List of ornithology journals

References

External links
 
 Living Bird at Biodiversity Heritage Library
 Living Bird at All About Birds

Quarterly magazines published in the United States
Cornell University publications
English-language magazines
Journals and magazines relating to birding and ornithology
Magazines established in 1962
Magazines published in New York (state)
Mass media in Ithaca, New York